Changjiang Road Station is an elevated metro station in Ningbo, Zhejiang, China. Changjiang Road Station is located in Xinqi Subdistrict near Taishan Road. Construction of the station started in December 2012, and service began on March 19, 2016.

Exits 
Changjiang Road Station has two exits.

References 

Railway stations in Zhejiang
Railway stations in China opened in 2016
Ningbo Rail Transit stations